The 1985 IAAF World Women's Road Race Championships was the third edition of the annual international road running competition organised by the International Amateur Athletics Federation (IAAF). The competition was hosted by the United Kingdom on 3 November 1985 in Gateshead and featured one race only: a 15K run for women. This was the first time  that the distance was contested at the championships, having previously been a 10K run, and this was a permanent change. There were individual and team awards available, with the national team rankings being decided by the combined finishing positions of a team's top three runners. Countries with fewer than three finishers were not ranked.

The race was won by Portugal's Aurora Cunha in a time of 49:17 minutes, completing a successful defence of her title from 1984. Judi St. Hilaire of the United States finished eight seconds later in second place, while Great Britain's Carole Bradford came third for a second year running. As she had the year before, Bradford led the British women to the team title (alongside fifth place Paula Fudge and Wendy Sly in eleventh). The Soviet Union's team, featuring Lyudmila Matveyeva in fourth and two other top ten finishers in Mariya Vasilyuk and Yelena Sipatova, was just one point behind in the team race. St Hilaire helped the American women to the bronze medal team position (backed up by Nancy Ditz and Carol McLatchie).

Results

Individual

Team

References

1985
IAAF World Women's Road Race Championships
IAAF World Women's Road Race Championships
IAAF World Women's Road Race Championships
IAAF World Women's Road Race Championships
Sport in Gateshead
International athletics competitions hosted by the United Kingdom